Highland-Winet Airport is a public-use airport located 3 miles northeast of Highland, Illinois. The airport is privately owned by the St. Louis Soaring Association.

Facilities and aircraft
The airport has one runway: runway 18/36 is 2200 x 100 ft (671 x 30 m) and made of turf. The airport does not have an FBO, and no fuel is available.

For the 12-month period ending May 31, 2018, the airport has 38 aircraft operations per week, or just under 2,000 per year. There are 25 aircraft based on the field: 19 gliders and 6 single-engine airplanes.

Accidents and incidents
On September 10, 2003, Burkhart Grob G102 Club Astir IIIB impacted terrain during an off-airport landing near Highland-Winet Airport. The glider was released from a tow plane at 3,000 feet, and the pilot reported the thermals he tried to fly in were weak, preventing the aircraft from maintaining altitude. The aircraft encountered a strong downdraft while returning to H07 and was unable to reach the airport.

References 

Airports in Illinois